Charles Richard Cathcart (November 6, 1924 – November 8, 1993) was an American Dixieland trumpet player who was best known as a member of The Lawrence Welk Show in which he appeared from 1962 to 1968.

Cathcart was born in Michigan City, Indiana, United States. He was a trumpeter for the U.S. Army Air Force Band and a member of big bands led by Bob Crosby, Ben Pollack, and Ray Noble.

After World War II, he moved to Los Angeles. His friend Jack Webb was playing the part of trumpeter Pete Kelly in the movie Pete Kelly's Blues and told Cathcart he should supply the music. The band from the movie stayed together in the 1950s for performances and recordings under the name Pete Kelly's Big Seven. Cathcart also supplied music for the TV show Dragnet, which starred Jack Webb as Joe Friday. He spent much of his career as a musician on The Lawrence Welk Show. On the Welk show, he met Peggy Lennon, a singer with the Lennon Sisters, and the two married.

Filmography

References

1924 births
1993 deaths
American trumpeters
American male trumpeters
Deaths from cancer in California
Dixieland jazz musicians
Musicians from Indiana
People from Michigan City, Indiana
20th-century American musicians
Lawrence Welk
20th-century trumpeters
American male jazz musicians
20th-century American male musicians